The 1924 Chicago Cardinals season was their fifth in the league. The team failed to improve on their previous output of 8–4, winning only five games. They finished eighth in the league.

Schedule

Standings

References

Arizona Cardinals seasons
Chicago Cardinals
Chicago